The 2018 Zhuhai Open was a professional tennis tournament played on hard courts. It was the third (ATP) and fourth (ITF) editions of the tournament and part of the 2018 ATP Challenger Tour and the 2018 ITF Women's Circuit. It took place at the Hengqin International Tennis Center in Zhuhai, China between 5 and 11 March 2018.

Men's singles main-draw entrants

Seeds

 1 Rankings are as of 26 February 2018.

Other entrants
The following players received wildcards into the singles main draw:
  Li Zhe
  Wu Di
  Zhang Ze
  Zhang Zhizhen

The following players received entry from the qualifying draw:
  Maverick Banes
  Alex Bolt
  Yusuke Takahashi
  Xia Zihao

Women's singles main-draw entrants

Seeds

 1 Rankings are as of 26 February 2018.

Other entrants
The following players received wildcards into the singles main draw:
  Gao Xinyu 
  Jiang Xinyu
  Tang Qianhui
  Yuan Yue

The following players received entry from the qualifying draw:
  Gai Ao
  Jessica Pieri
  Urszula Radwańska
  Xun Fangying

The following player received entry as a lucky loser:
  Feng Shuo

Champions

Men's singles

 Alex Bolt def.  Hubert Hurkacz, 5–7, 7–6(7–4), 6–2.

Women's singles

 Maryna Zanevska def.  Marta Kostyuk, 6–2, 6–4

Men's doubles

 Denys Molchanov /  Igor Zelenay def.  Aliaksandr Bury /  Peng Hsien-yin, 7–5, 7–6(7–4).

Women's doubles

 Anna Blinkova /  Lesley Kerkhove def.  Nao Hibino /  Danka Kovinić, 7–5, 6–4

See also
2018 WTA Elite Trophy

External links
2018 Zhuhai Open at ITFtennis.com

 
2018 ATP Challenger Tour
2018 in Chinese tennis
2018 ITF Women's Circuit
March 2018 sports events in China
2018